The trombone (Italian, French: trombone) is a musical instrument in the brass family. As with all brass instruments, sound is produced when the player's vibrating lips cause the air column inside the instrument to vibrate. Nearly all trombones use a telescoping slide mechanism to alter the pitch instead of the valves used by other brass instruments. The valve trombone is an exception, using three valves similar to those on a trumpet, and the superbone has valves and a slide.

The word "trombone" derives from Italian tromba (trumpet) and -one (a suffix meaning "large"), so the name means "large trumpet". The trombone has a predominantly cylindrical bore like the trumpet, in contrast to the more conical brass instruments like the cornet, the euphonium, and the French horn. The most frequently encountered trombones are the tenor trombone and bass trombone. These are treated as non-transposing instruments, reading at concert pitch in bass clef, with higher notes sometimes being notated in tenor clef. They are pitched in B♭, an octave below the B♭ trumpet and an octave above the B♭ bass tuba. The once common E♭ alto trombone became less common as improvements in technique extended the upper range of the tenor, but it is regaining popularity for its lighter sonority. In British brass-band music the tenor trombone is treated as a B♭ transposing instrument, written in treble clef, and the alto trombone is written at concert pitch, usually in alto clef.

A person who plays the trombone is called a trombonist or trombone player.

History

Etymology 
"Trombone" comes from the Italian word tromba (trumpet) plus the suffix -one (big), meaning "big trumpet".

During the Renaissance, the equivalent English term was "sackbut". The word first appears in court records in 1495 as "shakbusshe" at about the time King Henry VII married a Portuguese princess who brought musicians with her. "Shakbusshe" is similar to "sacabuche", attested in Spain as early as 1478. The French equivalent "saqueboute" appears in 1466.

The German "Posaune" long predates the invention of the slide and could refer to a natural trumpet as late as the early fifteenth century.

Origin 

Both towns and courts sponsored bands of shawms and trombone. The most famous and influential served the Duke of Burgundy. The trombone's principal role was the contratenor part in a dance band. The sackbut was used extensively across Europe, from its appearance in the 15th century to a decline in most places by the mid-late 17th century. It was used in outdoor events, in concert, and in liturgical settings. With trumpeters, trombonists in German city-states were employed as civil officials. As officials, these trombonists were often relegated to standing watch in the city towers but would also herald the arrival of important people to the city. This is similar to the role of a military bugler and was used as a sign of wealth and strength in 16th century German cities.

However, these trombonists were often viewed separately from the more skilled trombonists who played in groups such as the alta capella wind ensembles and the first orchestral ensembles. These performed in religious settings, such as St Mark's Basilica in Venice in the early 17th century.

Composers who wrote for trombone during this period include Claudio Monteverdi, Heinrich Schütz, Giovanni Gabrieli and his uncle Andrea Gabrieli. The trombone doubled voice parts in sacred works, but there are also solo pieces written for trombone in the early 17th century.

When the sackbut returned to common use in England in the 18th century, Italian music was so influential that the instrument became known as the "trombone", although in some countries the same name has been applied throughout its history, viz. Italian trombone and German Posaune. The 17th-century trombone was built in slightly smaller dimensions than modern trombones and had a bell that was more conical and less flared.

During the later Baroque period, Johann Sebastian Bach and George Frideric Handel used trombones on a few occasions. Bach called for a tromba di tirarsi to double the cantus firmus in some of his liturgical cantatas, which may be a form of the closely related slide trumpet. Bach also employed a choir of four trombones to double the chorus in three of his cantatas (BWV 2, BWV 21 and BWV 38), and also a quartet of three trombones and one cornett in the cantata BWV 25. Handel used it in the Death March from Saul, Samson, and Israel in Egypt. All were examples of an oratorio style popular during the early 18th century. Score notations are rare because only a few professional "Stadtpfeiffer" or alta cappella musicians were available. Handel, for instance, had to import trombones to England from a Royal court in Hanover, Germany, to perform one of his larger compositions. Therefore, trombone parts were rather seldom given "solo" roles that were not interchangeable with other instruments.

Classical period 
Christoph Willibald Gluck was the first major composer to use the trombone in an opera overture, Alceste (1767), but he also used it in operas such as Orfeo ed Euridice, Iphigénie en Tauride (1779) and Echo et Narcisse.

The construction of the trombone changed relatively little between the Baroque and Classical period. The most obvious change was in the bell, slightly more flared.

The first use of the trombone as an independent instrument in a symphony was in the Symphony in E♭ (1807) by Swedish composer Joachim Nicolas Eggert. But the composer usually credited with the trombone's introduction into the symphony orchestra was Ludwig van Beethoven in Symphony No. 5 in C minor (1808). Beethoven also used trombones in his Symphony No. 6 in F major ("Pastoral") and Symphony No. 9 ("Choral").

Romantic period

19th-century orchestras 
Trombones were often included in compositions, operas, and symphonies by composers such as Felix Mendelssohn, Hector Berlioz, Franz Berwald, Charles Gounod, Franz Liszt, Gioacchino Rossini, Franz Schubert, Robert Schumann, Giuseppe Verdi, and Richard Wagner among others.

Although the trombone trio had been paired with one or two cornets during the Renaissance and early Baroque periods, the disappearance of the cornet as a partner and replacement by oboe and clarinet left unchanged the trombone's purpose: to support the alto, tenor, and bass voices of the chorus (usually in ecclesiastical settings) where harmonic moving lines were more difficult to pick out than the melodic soprano line. But the introduction of trombones into the orchestra allied them more closely with trumpets, and soon an additional tenor trombone replaced alto. The Germans and Austrians kept alto trombone somewhat longer than the French, who preferred a section of three tenor trombones until after the Second World War. In other countries, the trio of two tenor trombones and one bass became standard by about the mid 19th century.

Trombonists were employed less by court orchestras and cathedrals and so were expected to provide their own instrument. Military musicians were provided with instruments, and instruments like the long F or E♭ bass trombone remained in military use until around the First World War. But orchestral musicians adopted the tenor trombone, the most versatile trombone that could play in the ranges of any of the three trombone parts that typically appeared in orchestral scores.

Valve trombones in the mid-19th century did little to alter the make-up of the orchestral trombone section; although it was ousted from orchestras in Germany and France, the valve trombone remained popular almost to the exclusion of the slide instrument in countries such as Italy and Bohemia. Composers such as Giuseppe Verdi, Giacomo Puccini, Bedřich Smetana, and Antonín Dvořák scored for a valve trombone section.

With the ophicleide or later, the tuba subjoined to the trombone trio during the 19th century, parts scored for the bass trombone rarely descended as low as parts scored before the addition of either of these new low brass instruments. Only in the early 20th century did it regain a degree of independence. Experiments with the trombone section included Richard Wagner's addition of a contrabass trombone in Der Ring des Nibelungen and Gustav Mahler's and Richard Strauss' augmentation by adding a second bass trombone to the usual trio of two tenor trombones and one bass trombone. The majority of orchestral works are still scored for the usual mid- to late-19th-century low brass section of two tenor trombones, one bass trombone, and one tuba.

19th-century wind bands 
Trombones have been a part of the large wind band since its inception as an ensemble during the French Revolution of 1791. During the 19th century wind band traditions were established, including circus bands, military bands, brass bands (primarily in the UK), and town bands (primarily in the US). Some of these, especially military bands in Europe, used rear-facing trombones where the bell section pointed behind the player's left shoulder. These bands played a limited repertoire, with few original compositions, that consisted mainly of orchestral transcriptions, arrangements of popular and patriotic tunes, and feature pieces for soloists (usually cornetists, singers, and violinists). A notable work for wind band is Berlioz's 1840 Grande symphonie funèbre et triomphale, which uses a trombone solo for the entire second movement.

Toward the end of the 19th century, trombone virtuosi began appearing as soloists in American wind bands. The most notable was Arthur Pryor, who played with the John Philip Sousa band and formed his own.

19th-century pedagogy 
In the Romantic era, Leipzig became a center of trombone pedagogy. The trombone began to be taught at the Musikhochschule founded by Felix Mendelssohn Bartholdy. The Paris Conservatory and its yearly exhibition also contributed to trombone education. At the Leipzig academy, Mendelssohn's bass trombonist, Karl Traugott Queisser, was the first in a long line of distinguished professors of the trombone. Several composers wrote works for Quiesser, including Ferdinand David (Mendelssohn's concertmaster) who wrote in 1837 the Concertino for Trombone and Orchestra, Ernst Sachse, and Friedrich August Belcke, whose solo works remain popular in Germany. Queisser helped re-establish the reputation of the trombone in Germany. He championed and popularized Christian Friedrich Sattler's tenor-bass trombone during the 1840s, leading to its widespread use in orchestras throughout Germany and Austria.

19th-century construction 
Sattler had a great influence on trombone design. He introduced a significant widening of the bore (the most important since the Renaissance), the innovations of Schlangenverzierungen (snake decorations), the bell garland, and the wide bell flare—features still found on German-made trombones that were widely copied during the 19th century.

The trombone was further improved in the 19th century with the addition of "stockings" at the end of the inner slide to reduce friction, the development of the water key to expel condensation from the horn, and the occasional addition of a valve that, intentionally, only was to be set on or off but later was to become the regular F-valve. Additionally, the valve trombone came around the 1850s shortly after the invention of valves, and was in common use in Italy and Austria in the second half of the century.

Twentieth century

20th-century orchestras 
In the 20th century the trombone maintained its important place in the orchestra in works by Béla Bartók, Alban Berg, Leonard Bernstein, Benjamin Britten, Aaron Copland, Edward Elgar, George Gershwin, Gustav Holst, Leos Janacek, Gustav Mahler, Olivier Messiaen, Darius Milhaud, Carl Nielsen, Sergei Prokofiev, Sergei Rachmaninoff, Maurice Ravel, Ottorino Respighi, Arnold Schoenberg, Dmitri Shostakovich, Jean Sibelius, Richard Strauss, Igor Stravinsky, Ralph Vaughan Williams, Heitor Villa-Lobos, and William Walton.

With the rise of recorded music and music schools, orchestral trombone sections around the world began to have a more consistent idea of a standard trombone sound. British orchestras abandoned the use of small bore tenors and G basses in favor of an American/German approach of large bore tenors and B♭ basses in the 1940s. French orchestras did the same in the 1960s.

20th-century wind bands 
During the first half of the century, touring and community concert bands lost their popularity in the United States and were greatly reduced in number. However, with the development of music education in the public school system, high school, and university concert bands and marching bands and became ubiquitous in the US. A typical concert band trombone section consists of two tenor trombones and one bass trombone, but using multiple players per part is common practice, especially in public-school settings.

Use in jazz 

In the 1900s the trombone assisted the bass or tuba player's job of outlining chords for the other instruments by playing a bass line for the higher-pitched instruments to improvise over. It was not until the swing era of the mid-1920s that the trombone began to be used as a solo instrument. Examples of early trombone soloists are Jack Teagarden and J.J. Johnson.

20th-century construction 
Changes in construction have occurred during the 20th century, such as the use of different materials; increases in mouthpiece, bore, and bell dimensions; and in types of mutes and valves. Despite the universal switch to a larger horn, many European trombone makers prefer a slightly smaller bore than their American counterparts.

One of the most significant changes is the popularity of the F-attachment trigger. Through the mid-20th century, orchestral trombonists used instruments that lacked a trigger because there was no need for one. But as 20th century composers such as Mahler became popular, tenor trombone parts began to extend down into lower ranges that required a trigger. Although some trombonists prefer "straight" trombone models without triggers, most have added them for convenience and versatility.

Contemporary use 
The trombone can be found in symphony orchestras, concert bands, big bands, marching bands, military bands, brass bands, and brass choirs. In chamber music, it is used in brass quintets, quartets, or trios, or trombone trios, quartets, or choirs. The size of a trombone choir can vary from five or six to twenty or more members. Trombones are also common in swing, jazz, merengue, salsa, R&B, ska, and New Orleans brass bands.

Construction 

The trombone is a predominantly cylindrical tube with two "U"-shaped bends and a flared bell at the end. The tubing is approximately cylindrical but actually contains a complex series of tapers which affect the intonation of the instrument. As with other brass instruments, sound is produced by blowing air through pursed lips producing a vibration that creates a standing wave in the instrument. 

The detachable cup-shaped mouthpiece is similar to that of the baritone horn and closely related to that of the trumpet. It has a venturi: a small constriction of the air column that adds resistance, greatly affecting the tone of the instrument. The slide section consists of a leadpipe, inner and outer slide tubes, and bracing, or "stays". The soldered stays on modern instruments replaced the loose stays found on sackbuts (medieval precursors to trombones).

The most distinctive feature of the trombone is the slide that lengthens the tubing and lowers the pitch (cf. valve trombone). During the Renaissance, sleeves (called "stockings") were developed to decrease friction that would impede the slide's motion. These were soldered onto the ends of the inner slide tubes to slightly increase their diameter. The ends of inner slides on modern instruments are manufactured with a slightly larger diameter to achieve the same end. This part of the slide must be lubricated frequently. The slide section is connected to the bell section by the neckpipe and a U-bend called the bell or back bow. The joint connecting the slide and bell sections has a threaded collar to secure the connection. Prior to the early 20th century this connection was made with friction joints alone.

Trombones have a short tuning slide in the U-shaped bend between the neckpipe and the bell, a feature designed by the French maker François Riedlocker in the early 19th century. It was incorporated into French and British designs, and later to German and American models, although German trombones were built without tuning slides well into the 20th century. Many types of trombone also include one or more rotary valves connected to additional tubing which lengthens the instrument. This extends the low range of the instrument and creates the option of using alternate slide positions for many notes.

Like the trumpet, the trombone is considered a cylindrical bore instrument since it has extensive sections of tubing that are of unchanging diameter (the slide section must be cylindrical in order to function). A number of common variations on trombone construction are noted below.

Bells 
Trombone bells (and sometimes slides) may be constructed of different brass mixtures. The most common material is yellow brass (70% copper, 30% zinc), but other materials include rose brass (85% copper, 15% zinc) and red brass (90% copper, 10% zinc). Some manufacturers offer interchangeable bells. The smallest sizes are found in small jazz trombones and older narrow-bore instruments, while the larger sizes are common in orchestral models. The bell may be constructed out of two separate brass sheets or out of one single piece of metal and hammered on a mandrel until the part is shaped correctly. The edge of the bell may be finished with or without a piece of bell wire to secure it, which also affects the tone quality; most bells are built with bell wire. Occasionally, trombone bells are made from solid sterling silver.

Valve attachments 

Modern trombones often have a valve attachment, an extra loop of tubing attached to the bell section and engaged by a valve operated by the left hand by means of a lever or trigger. The valve attachment aids in increasing the lower range of the instrument, while also allowing alternate slide positions for difficult music passages. A valve can also make trills easier.

Valve attachments are most commonly found on tenor and bass trombones, but they can appear on sizes from soprano to contrabass.

Soprano
In the early 2010s Torbjörn Hultmark of the Royal College of Music commissioned the first soprano trombone in B♭ with an F valve, built by Thein Brass.

Alto
Although rare on the E alto trombone, a valve attachment usually lowers the instrument a perfect fourth into B, providing the first five or six positions from the tenor trombone slide. Some alto models have what is called a trill valve, providing a small loop of tubing that lowers the instrument by only a minor or major second, into D or D♭ respectively.

Tenor
Tenor trombones, especially the larger bore symphonic models, commonly have a valve attachment which lowers the instrument from B to F.

It provides access to the otherwise missing notes between the pedal B♭ in first position, and the second partial E in seventh, as well as providing alternate slide positions for other notes in long (sixth and seventh) positions. Because the attachment tubing increases the length of the overall instrument by one-third, the distances between slide positions must also be one-third longer when the valve is engaged, resulting in only six positions available on the F slide, to low C. Thus, the F attachment cannot provide the low B♮, but it usually has a sufficiently long tuning slide to lower it into E as required, which will provide B♮ in a very long position.

Tenor trombones without a valve are sometimes known as straight trombones.

Bass

The modern bass trombone usually has two valve attachments to provide all of the notes that are absent on an instrument with no valves (B♮ – E). This allows the player to produce a complete chromatic range upwards from the pedal register.

The first valve is an F attachment the same as that found on a tenor trombone and extends the range down to C. The second valve, engaged together with the first, lowers the instrument to D (or less commonly, E♭) and provides the low B. The second valve can be dependent, where it serves to lower the F attachment to D and has no effect alone. More commonly the second valve is independent, where it can be engaged separately to lower the instrument to G♭, or to D when both are engaged.

Single-valve B♭ bass trombones with an F attachment are still made but are now less common than two-valve bass trombones. They are essentially very large bore tenor trombones, and likewise cannot provide the low B♮ without lowering the valve to E with a long tuning slide.

Contrabass

Contrabass trombones in F typically have two independent valves, tuned either to C and D♭ combining to A, or in European models tuned to D and B♭ combining to A♭. Contrabass trombones in low B♭ usually have only one valve in F, although Miraphone make a model in C with two independent valves in G and A♭, which combine to E.

Valve types 

The most common type of valve seen for valve attachments is the rotary valve, appearing on most band instruments, as well as most student and intermediate model trombones. Many improvements of the rotary valve, as well as entirely new and radically different valve designs, have been invented since the mid 20th century to give the trombone a more open, free sound than the tight bends in conventional rotary valve designs would allow. Many of these new valve designs have been widely adopted by players, especially in symphony orchestras. The Thayer axial flow valve is often available on professional models from most trombone manufacturers, and the Hagmann valve particularly from European manufacturers.

Some trombones have three piston or rotary valves instead of a slide; see valve trombone.

Tubing 

F attachment tubing usually has a larger bore through the attachment than through the rest of the instrument. The attachment tubing also incorporates a tuning slide to tune the valve separately from the rest of the instrument, usually long enough to lower the pitch by a semitone when fully extended (from F to E on tenor and bass trombones, to reach the missing low B).

Originally, valve attachment tubing was always coiled tightly to keep within the bell section (closed wrap  or traditional wrap). In the early 1980s, American instrument manufacturers began producing instruments with open wrap, around the same time that the Thayer valve began to emerge among orchestral players. Open wrap F attachment tubing is shaped in a single loop free of tight bends, resulting in a freer response and more "open" sound through the valve.

In marching bands and other situations where the trombone may be more prone to damage, the confined traditional wrap is more common, since open wrap tubing protrudes behind the bell section.

Tuning 

Some trombones are tuned using a mechanism in the slide section instead of a tuning slide in the bell section. Having the tuning slide in the bell section (the more typical setup) requires two sections of cylindrical tubing in an otherwise conical part of the instrument, which affects the tone quality. Placing the tuning mechanism in the cylindrical slide section allows the bell section to remain conical.

Slides 
The slide may also be built with a dual-bore configuration, in which the bore of the second leg of the slide is slightly larger than the bore of the first leg, producing a stepwise conical effect.

Mouthpiece 

The mouthpiece is a separate part of the trombone and can be interchanged between similarly sized trombones from different manufacturers. Available mouthpieces for trombone (as with all brass instruments) vary in material composition, length, diameter, rim shape, cup depth, throat entrance, venturi aperture, venturi profile, outside design and other factors. Variations in mouthpiece construction affect the individual player's ability to make a lip seal and produce a reliable tone, the timbre of that tone, its volume, the instrument's intonation tendencies, the player's subjective level of comfort, and the instrument's playability in a given pitch range.

Mouthpiece selection is a highly personal decision. Thus, a symphonic trombonist might prefer a mouthpiece with a deeper cup and sharper inner rim shape in order to produce a rich symphonic tone quality, while a jazz trombonist might choose a shallower cup for brighter tone and easier production of higher notes. Further, for certain compositions, these choices between two such performers could easily be reversed. Some mouthpiece makers now offer mouthpieces that feature removable rims, cups, and shanks allowing players to further customize and adjust their mouthpieces to their preference.

Plastic 

Instruments made mostly from plastic, including the pBone and the Tromba plastic trombone, emerged in the 2010s as a cheaper and more robust alternative to brass. Plastic instruments could come in almost any colour but the sound plastic instruments produce is different from that of brass. While originally seen as a gimmick, these plastic models have found increasing popularity of the last decade and are now viewed as practice tools that make for more convenient travel as well as a cheaper option for beginning players not wishing to invest so much money in a trombone right away. Manufacturers now produce large-bore models with triggers as well as smaller alto models.

Regional variations

Germany and Austria 
German trombones have been built in a wide variety of bore and bell sizes. The traditional German Konzertposaune can differ substantially from American designs in many aspects. The mouthpiece is typically rather small and is placed into a slide section with a very long leadpipe of at least . The whole instrument is typically made of gold brass. They are constructed using very thin metal (especially in the bell section), and many have a metal ring called a kranz ("crown") on the rim of the bell. Their sound is very even across dynamic levels but it can be difficult to play at louder volumes. While their bore sizes were considered large in the 19th century, German trombones have altered very little over the last 150 years and are now typically somewhat smaller than their American counterparts. Bell sizes remain very large in all sizes of German trombone and a bass trombone bell may exceed  in diameter.

Valve attachments in tenor and bass trombones were first seen in the mid 19th century, originally on the tenor B trombone. Before 1850, bass trombone parts were mostly played on a slightly longer F-bass trombone (a fourth lower). The first valve was simply a fourth-valve, or in German "Quart-ventil", built onto a B tenor trombone, to allow playing in low F. This valve was first built without a return spring, and was only intended to set the instrument in B or F for extended passages. Since the mid-20th century, modern instruments use a trigger to engage the valve while playing.

As with other traditional German and Austrian brass instruments, rotary valves are used to the exclusion of almost all other types of valve, even in valve trombones. Other features often found on German trombones include long water keys as well as Schlangenverzierungen (snake decorations) on the slide and bell U-bows.

Since around 1925, when jazz music became popular, Germany has been selling "American trombones" as well. Most trombones made and/or played in Germany today, especially by amateurs, are built in the American fashion, as those are much more widely available, and thus far cheaper. However, some higher-end manufacturers such as Thein make modern iterations of the classic German Konzertposaune, as well as American-style trombones with German features like the kranz and snake decorations.

France 
French trombones were built in the very smallest bore sizes up to the end of the Second World War and whilst other sizes were made there, the French usually preferred the tenor trombone to any other size. French music, therefore, usually employed a section of three tenor trombones up to the mid–20th century. French tenor trombones were built in both C and B♭, altos in D♭, sopranos in F, piccolos in B♭, basses in G and E♭, and contrabasses in B♭.

Types 

The most frequently encountered types of trombone today are the tenor and bass, though as with many other instrument families such as the clarinet, the trombone has been built in sizes from piccolo to contrabass. Although trombones are usually constructed with a slide to change the pitch, valve trombones instead use the set of three valves common on other brass instruments.

Slide trombones

Contrabass trombone 

The contrabass trombone is the lowest trombone, first appearing in BB♭ an octave below the tenor with a double slide. This design was commissioned by Wagner in the 1870s for his Der Ring des Nibelungen opera cycle. Since the late 20th century however, it has largely been supplanted by a less cumbersome single-slide bass-contrabass instrument pitched in 12' F. With two valve attachments to provide the same full range as its predecessor, this design is effectively a modern bass trombone built down a perfect fourth. Although the contrabass has only appeared occasionally in orchestral repertoire and is not a permanent member of the modern orchestra, it has enjoyed a revival in the 21st century, particularly in film and video game soundtracks.

Bass trombone 

Although early instruments were pitched in G, F or E♭ below the tenor trombone, the modern bass trombone is pitched in the same B as the tenor but with a wider bore, a larger bell, and a larger mouthpiece. These features facilitate playing in the lower register of the instrument. Modern bass trombones have valves that allow a fully chromatic range down to the pedal register (B). In Britain, the bass trombone in G was used in orchestras from the mid 19th century and survived into the 1950s, particularly in British brass bands.

Tenor trombone 
The tenor trombone has a fundamental note of B and is usually treated as a non-transposing instrument (see below). Tenor trombones with C as their fundamental note were almost equally popular in the mid-19th century in Britain and France. As the trombone in its simplest form has neither crooks, valves nor keys to lower the pitch by a specific interval, trombonists use seven chromatic slide positions. Each position progressively increases the length of the air column, thus lowering the pitch.

Extending the slide from one position to the next lowers the pitch by one semitone. Thus, each note in the harmonic series can be lowered by an interval of up to a tritone.  The lowest note of the standard instrument is therefore an E – a tritone below B. Most experienced trombonists can play lower "falset" notes and much lower pedal notes (first partials or fundamentals, which have a peculiar metallic rumbling sound). Slide positions are subject to adjustment, compensating for imperfections in the tuning of different harmonics. The fifth partial is rather flat on most trombones and usually requires a minute shortening of the slide position to compensate; other small adjustments are also normally required throughout the range. Trombonists make frequent use of alternate positions to minimize slide movement in rapid passages; for instance, B3 may be played in first or fifth position.  Alternate positions are also needed to allow a player to produce a glissando to or from a higher note on the same partial.

While the lowest note of the tenor trombone's range (excluding fundamentals or pedal notes) is E2, the trombone's upper range is theoretically open-ended. The practical top of the range is sometimes considered to be F5, or more conservatively D5. The range of the C tenor trombone is F2 to G5.

Alto trombone 

The alto trombone is smaller than the tenor trombone and almost always pitched in E♭ a fourth higher than the tenor, although examples pitched in F are occasionally found. Modern instruments are sometimes fitted with a valve to lower the pitch, either by a semitone to D (known as a "trill" valve), or by a fourth into B♭. The alto trombone was commonly used in the 16th to the 18th centuries in church music to strengthen the alto voice, particularly in the Mass. Early 19th century composers such as Beethoven, Brahms, and Schumann began writing for alto trombone in their symphonies, but the subsequent use and popularity of tenor trombones in the orchestra largely eclipsed their use until a modern revival that began in the late 20th century.

Soprano trombone 

The soprano trombone is usually pitched in B an octave above the tenor, and has seldom been used since its first known appearance in 1677 outside of trombone choirs in Moravian Church music. Built with mouthpiece, bore and bell dimensions similar to the B trumpet, it tends to be played by trumpet players. During the 20th century some soprano trombones—dubbed slide cornets—were made as novelties or for use by jazz players including Louis Armstrong and Dizzy Gillespie. A small number of contemporary proponents of the instrument include jazz artists Wycliffe Gordon and Christian Scott, and classical trumpeter Torbjörn Hultmark, who advocates for its use as an instrument for young children to learn music.

Sopranino and piccolo trombones 

The sopranino and piccolo trombones appeared in the 1950s as novelty instruments, and are even smaller and higher than the soprano. They are pitched in high E and B respectively, one octave above the alto and soprano trombones. Owing to being essentially a slide variant of the piccolo trumpet, they are played primarily by trumpet players.

Trombones with valves

Valve trombone 

In the 19th century as soon as brass instrument valves were invented, trombones with valves instead of slides were adopted widely in orchestras, and remain popular in some parts of Europe and in military bands.

Cimbasso 

The cimbasso covers the same range as a tuba or a contrabass trombone. The term  first appeared in early 19th century Italian opera scores, and originally referred to an upright serpent or an ophicleide. The modern cimbasso first appeared in the 1880s and has three to six piston or rotary valves and a predominantly cylindrical bore. They are most often pitched in 12' F, although models are available in E♭ and occasionally 16' C and 18' B♭. The cimbasso is most commonly used in performances of late Romantic Italian operas by Verdi and Puccini, but has also experienced a 21st century increase in use in film, television and video game soundtracks.

Superbone 

A hybrid, "duplex" or "double" trombone is a design of trombone that has both a slide and a set of three valves for altering the pitch. It has been reinvented several times since first appearing in the 19th century by Besson, and later Conn. Jazz trombonist and machinist Brad Gowans invented his "valide trombone" in the 1940s with a short four-position slide. In the 1970s Maynard Ferguson and Holton produced the "Superbone", very similar to the earlier Conn. In 2013 Schagerl in collaboration with James Morrison announced a larger bore variant with rotary valves.

Flugabone 

The "flugabone" (or sometimes "flugelbone"), portmanteau of "flugelhorn" and "trombone", also known as the "marching trombone", is a marching brass instrument, essentially a valve trombone wrapped into a compact flugelhorn shape. It retains the cylindrical bore of the trombone, rather than the conical bore of either the flugelhorn or bugle, and thus is similar in playing characteristics to a valve trombone. A similar marching trombone is the "trombonium" first produced by King Musical Instruments, wrapped and held vertically like a euphonium.

Other variants

Sackbut 

The term "sackbut" refers to the early forms of the trombone commonly used during the Renaissance and Baroque eras, with a characteristically smaller, more cylindrically-proportioned bore, and a less-flared bell.

Buccin 

A distinctive form of tenor trombone was popularized in France in the early 19th century.  Called the buccin, it featured a tenor trombone slide and a bell that ended in a zoomorphic (serpent or dragon) head. It sounds like a cross between a trombone and a French horn, with a very wide dynamic range but a limited and variable range of pitch. Hector Berlioz wrote for the buccin in his Messe solennelle of 1824.

Tromboon 
A portmanteau of "trombone" and "bassoon", the "tromboon" was created by musical parodist Peter Schickele by replacing a trombone's mouthpiece with the reed and bocal of a bassoon. It appears in several humorous works of Schickele's fictional composer, P. D. Q. Bach.

Technique

Basic slide positions 

The modern system has seven chromatic slide positions on a tenor trombone in B. It was first described by Andre Braun circa 1795.

In 1811 Joseph Fröhlich wrote on the differences between the modern system and an old system where four diatonic slide positions were used and the trombone was usually keyed to A. To compare between the two styles the chart below may be helpful (take note for example, in the old system contemporary 1st-position was considered "drawn past" then current 1st). In the modern system, each successive position outward (approximately ) will produce a note which is one semitone lower when played in the same partial. Tightening and loosening the lips will allow the player to "bend" the note up or down by a semitone without changing position, so a slightly out-of-position slide may be compensated for by ear.

Partials and intonation 

As with all brass instruments, progressive tightening of the lips and increased air pressure allow the player to move to different partial in the harmonic series. In the first position (also called closed position) on a B♭ trombone, the notes in the harmonic series begin with B♭2 (one octave higher than the pedal B♭1), F3 (a perfect fifth higher than the previous partial), B♭3 (a perfect fourth higher), D4 (a major third higher), and F4 (a minor third higher).

F4 marks the sixth partial, or the fifth overtone. Notes on the next partial, for example A♭4 (a minor third higher) in first position, tend to be out of tune in regards to the twelve-tone equal temperament scale. A♭4 in particular, which is at the seventh partial (sixth overtone) is nearly always 31 cents, or about one third of a semitone, flat of the minor seventh.  On the slide trombone, such deviations from intonation are corrected for by slightly adjusting the slide or by using an alternate position. Although much of Western music has adopted the even-tempered scale, it has been the practice in Germany and Austria to play these notes in position, where they will have just intonation (see harmonic seventh as well for A♭4).

The next higher partials—B♭4 (a major second higher), C5 (a major second higher), D5 (a major second higher)—do not require much adjustment for even-tempered intonation, but E♭5 (a minor second higher) is almost exactly a quarter tone higher than it would be in twelve-tone equal temperament. E♭5 and F5 (a major second higher) at the next partial are very high notes; a very skilled player with a highly developed facial musculature and diaphragm can go even higher to G5, A♭5, B♭5 and beyond.

The higher in the harmonic series any two successive notes are, the closer they tend to be (as evidenced by the progressively smaller intervals noted above).  A byproduct of this is the relatively few motions needed to move between notes in the higher ranges of the trombone. In the lower range, significant movement of the slide is required between positions, which becomes more exaggerated on lower pitched trombones, but for higher notes the player need only use the first four positions of the slide since the partials are closer together, allowing higher notes in alternate positions. As an example, F4 (at the bottom of the treble clef) may be played in first, fourth or sixth position on a B♭ trombone. The note E1 (or the lowest E on a standard 88-key piano keyboard) is the lowest attainable note on a  B♭ tenor trombone, requiring a full  of tubing. On trombones without an F attachment, there is a gap between B♭1 (the fundamental in first position) and E2 (the first harmonic in seventh position). Skilled players can produce "falset" notes between these, but the sound is relatively weak and not usually used in performance. The addition of an F attachment allows for intermediate notes to be played with more clarity.

Pedal tones 

The pedal tone on B♭ is frequently seen in commercial scoring but much less often in symphonic music while notes below that are called for only rarely as they "become increasingly difficult to produce and insecure in quality" with A♭ or G being the bottom limit for most tenor trombonists. Some contemporary orchestral writing, movie or video game scoring, trombone ensemble and solo works will call for notes as low as a pedal C, B, or even double pedal B♭ on the bass trombone.

Glissando  
The trombone is one of the few wind instruments that can produce a true glissando, by moving the slide without interrupting the airflow or sound production. Every pitch in a glissando must have the same harmonic number, and a tritone is the largest interval that can be performed as a glissando.

'Harmonic', 'inverted', 'broken' or 'false' glissandos are those that cross one or more harmonic series, requiring a simulated or faked glissando effect.

Trills 
Trills, though generally simple with valves, are difficult on the slide trombone. Trills tend to be easiest and most effective higher in the harmonic series because the distance between notes is much smaller and slide movement is minimal. For example, a trill on B3/C4 is virtually impossible as the slide must move two positions (either 1st-to-3rd or 5th-to-3rd), however at an octave higher (B4/C5) the notes can both be achieved in 1st position as a lip trill. Thus, the most convincing trills tend to be above the first octave and a half of the tenor's range. Trills are most commonly found in early Baroque and Classical music for the trombone as a means of ornamentation, however, some more modern pieces will call for trills as well.

Notation 
Unlike most other brass instruments in an orchestral setting, the trombone is not usually considered a transposing instrument. Prior to the invention of valve systems, most brass instruments were limited to playing one overtone series at a time; altering the pitch of the instrument required manually replacing a section of tubing (called a "crook") or picking up an instrument of different length. Their parts were transposed according to which crook or length-of-instrument they used at any given time, so that a particular note on the staff always corresponded to a particular partial on the instrument. Trombones, on the other hand, have used slides since their inception. As such, they have always been fully chromatic, so no such tradition took hold, and trombone parts have always been notated at concert pitch (with one exception, discussed below). Also, it was quite common for trombones to double choir parts; reading in concert pitch meant there was no need for dedicated trombone parts. Note that while the fundamental sounding pitch (slide fully retracted) has remained quite consistent, the conceptual pitch of trombones has changed since their origin (e.g. Baroque A tenor = modern B-flat tenor).

Trombone parts are typically notated in bass clef, though sometimes also written in tenor clef or alto clef. The use of alto clef is usually confined to orchestral first trombone parts, with the second trombone part written in tenor clef and the third (bass) part in bass clef. As the alto trombone declined in popularity during the 19th century, this practice was gradually abandoned and first trombone parts came to be notated in the tenor or bass clef. Some Russian and Eastern European composers wrote first and second tenor trombone parts on one alto clef staff (the German Robert Schumann was the first to do this). Examples of this practice are evident in scores by Igor Stravinsky, Sergei Prokofiev, Dmitri Shostakovich. Trombone parts in band music are nearly exclusively notated in bass clef. The rare exceptions are in contemporary works intended for high-level wind bands.

An accomplished performer today is expected to be proficient in reading parts notated in bass clef, tenor clef, alto clef, and (more rarely) treble clef in C, with the British brass-band performer expected to handle treble clef in B♭ as well.

Mutes 

A variety of mutes can be used with the trombone to alter its timbre. Many are held in place with the use of cork grips, including the straight, cup, harmon and pixie mutes. Some fit over the bell, like the bucket mute. In addition to this, mutes can be held in front of the bell and moved to cover more or less area for a wah-wah effect. Mutes used in this way include the "hat" (a metal mute shaped like a bowler hat) and plunger (which looks like, and often is, the rubber suction cup from a sink or toilet plunger). The "wah-wah" sound of a trombone with a harmon mute is featured as the voices of adults in the Peanuts cartoons.

Didactics 
Several makers have begun to market compact B♭/C trombones that are especially well suited for young children learning to play the trombone who cannot reach the outer slide positions of full-length instruments. The fundamental note of the unenhanced length is C, but the short valved attachment that puts the instrument in B♭ is open when the trigger is not depressed. While such instruments have no seventh slide position, C and B natural may be comfortably accessed on the first and second positions by using the trigger. A similar design ("Preacher model") was marketed by C.G. Conn in the 1920s, also under the Wurlitzer label. Currently, B♭/C trombones are available from many manufacturers, including German makers Günter Frost, Thein and Helmut Voigt, as well as the Yamaha Corporation.

Manufacturers 
Trombones in slide and valve configuration have been made by a vast array of musical instrument manufacturers. For the brass bands of the late 19th and early 20th century, prominent American manufacturers included Graves and Sons, E. G. Wright and Company, Boston Musical Instrument Company, E. A. Couturier, H. N. White Company/King Musical Instruments, J. W. York, and C.G. Conn. In the 21st century, leading mainstream manufacturers of trombones include Bach, Conn, Courtois, Edwards, Getzen, Jupiter, King, Rath, Schilke, S.E. Shires, Thein, Willson and Yamaha.

See also 
 Aequale
 Shout band
 Trombone repertoire

References

Further reading 

 
 
 
 
 
 Carter, Stewart (2011). The Trombone in the Renaissance: A History in Pictures and Documents. Bucina: The Historic Brass Society Series. Hillsdale, N.Y.: Pendragon Press. .

External links 

 
 International Trombone Association
 Online Trombone Journal
 British Trombone Society
 Trombone History Timeline by Will Kimball, Professor of Trombone at Brigham Young University
 Acoustics of Brass Instruments from Music Acoustics at the University of New South Wales
 Sources for the Prescribed Sheet Music for the ABRSM practical exams
 Two Frequencies Trombone
 NPR story about trombone bands (2003)
 Overview of trombones on the MIMO (Musical Instrument Museums Online) portal

Slide positions 
 Christian E. Waage (2009). "Slide Position Chart", YeoDoug.com
 Antonio J. García. (1997). "Choosing Alternate Positions for Bebop Lines", GarciaMusic.com.

B-flat instruments
Bass (sound)
Continuous pitch instruments
Jazz instruments
Marching band instruments
Orchestral instruments